KXBF-LD, virtual and UHF digital channel 14, is a low-powered SonLife-affiliated television station licensed to Bakersfield, California, United States. The station is owned by HC2 Holdings.

History 
The station’s construction permit was issued on February 25, 2010 under the calls of K14NN-D . The callsign changed to the current KXBF-LD on August 28, 2013.

Subchannels
The station's digital signal is multiplexed:

References

External links

Low-power television stations in the United States
Innovate Corp.
XBF-LD
Television channels and stations established in 2010
2010 establishments in California